Scalasaig lies on the east coast of Colonsay in the Hebrides of Scotland. It is the main settlement on the island and its only port; thus tourists arriving by ferry must pass through it on the way to any part of the isle. It contains the island's shop and post office (in the same building), parish church, microbrewery, doctor's surgery, village hall, cafe and hotel/bar.

History 
The name "Scalasaig" is Norse and means "Skali's bay".

References

Villages in Argyll and Bute
Villages in the Inner Hebrides
Colonsay